WKYE (96.5 FM, "Key 96.5") is a commercial radio station licensed to serve Johnstown, Pennsylvania. The station is owned by Seven Mountains Media, through licensee Southern Belle Media Family, LLC, and broadcasts an adult contemporary format.

History: Beginnings as WJAC-FM

For many years, this station was at 95.5 MHz and had the WJAC-FM call sign. It was the sister station of WJAC (now WKGE) and WJAC-TV, the local NBC affiliate. The station simulcast WJAC regularly, with occasional breaks for separate programming throughout the day, usually playing easy-listening music. WJAC and WJAC-FM radio studios were co-located with WJAC-TV, on Old Hickory Lane in Upper Yoder Township (with a Johnstown postal address). Both the AM and FM studios overlooked the television studios from the second floor.

The Birth of Key 95

In the fall of 1983, the decision was made to completely separate the two radio stations, assigning WJAC-FM the new call letters WKYE with the Key 95 branding. Debuting on September 25, 1983, the station programmed a hybrid of both Top 40 and adult contemporary music, quickly making it an office favorite in both Johnstown and Altoona, with its 57,000-watt Class C signal, one of only two in western Pennsylvania (WXDX in Pittsburgh is the other). One thing that remained unchanged was the station's signing off on Sunday nights at midnight for "maintenance".

Sandy D. Neri, long known for programming WCRO in Johnstown, was the first General Manager of "Key-95", having left WCRO the year before after that station came under new ownership. The first airstaff was:  Mike Farrow mornings, Jim Burton middays, Jack Michaels afternoons, Doug Wilkin nights and Diane Chase overnights. Farrow and Michaels had worked with GM Sandy Neri at WCRO and worked together briefly at WJNL and WJNL-FM prior to starting Key-95. Wilkin had worked at WJAC-FM and hosted "Jazz Night Out", a standout jazz-only program in the Johnstown-Altoona market. The station moved to new studios at 109 Plaza Drive in the Westmont section of Johnstown. The very first song played on Key-95 was "Brand New Key" by Melanie. Original jingle packages included Jam Productions "The Best Show in Johnstown".

In 1984, both WJAC and WKYE separated from their co-owned television station when WJAC, Inc. sold the radio operations to Winston Radio, Inc. WJAC-TV meteorologist Jim Burton, who hosted the Key 95 morning show in addition to his duties at WJAC-TV, was allowed to continue working at both WJAC-TV and WKYE until leaving the area in the early 1990s. He later returned to the Johnstown area and can still be seen doing the weather on WJAC-TV. Winston Radio sold WKYE and WJAC to Forever Broadcasting in 1997.

Key 95 to 96 Key

Clear Channel decided to leave the Johnstown radio business at the beginning of the 21st Century, selling off its individual properties, including WMTZ (known as country station 96.5 the Mountain), which had been known for years as WJNL prior to 1990. Forever Broadcasting, owner of Key 95, took advantage of the opportunity to purchase WMTZ and strengthen its foothold in the Johnstown radio market.

Forever Broadcasting had been known for more than a decade by this time as the "Froggy" people, owning the country-formatted stations with that same name, with stations in Somerset (which has since changed hands), Altoona, and State College. Forever's Altoona-based Froggy property at 98.1, came in spotty at best in Johnstown despite its 30,000-watt signal, largely due to the rugged mountainous terrain separating Johnstown and Altoona.

As part of a strategic move, Forever decided to swap frequencies between WKYE and WMTZ, and to make 95.5 into a country station, largely because of its clear penetration into the Pittsburgh market from the east, through its much stronger signal. Forever had acquired stations in the north, south, and west suburbs of Pittsburgh (almost all of which were rechristened under the Froggy brand), but none in the eastern suburbs of the city.

In February 2005, the swap became official, as WKYE assumed the facility of 96.5 and the new 96 Key branding, while WMTZ moved to 95.5 with the Froggy 95 branding, and adopting the new WFGI-FM call sign.

WKYE celebrated its 25th anniversary on October 3, 2008.

96 Key to Key 96.5
In 2019, the words in the branding were changed to "Key 96.5".

Pending sale to Seven Mountains Media
It was announced on October 12, 2022 that Forever Media is selling 34 stations, including WKYE and the entire Johnstown cluster, to State College-based Seven Mountains Media for $17.3 million. The deal closed on January 2, 2023.

References

External links

KYE
Radio stations established in 1949
1949 establishments in Pennsylvania